Plympton railway station was a former railway station located at Plympton in Devon on the South Devon Main Line between Exeter and Plymouth. Plympton was a town in its own right when the railway was constructed but is today an eastern suburb of the city of Plymouth.

History
Railway facilities in Plympton had originally been provided by the horse-drawn Plymouth and Dartmoor Railway, but their branch to Plympton was closed and sold to the South Devon Railway to allow the construction of their new line. The new station was not ready to be opened with the railway, but was brought into use six weeks later on 15 June 1848. Westwards the line ran into Plymouth Millbay railway station from 1849. In 1871 an intermediate station was opened at Mutley. From 1859 the South Devon and Tavistock Railway opened a new branch northwards from Plymouth to Tavistock and beyond. In 1865 a new station Marsh Mills was opened close to Plympton on this branch.

From 1 June 1904 Plymouth was the eastern terminus for enhanced Plymouth area suburban services, which saw steam railmotors used to fight competition from electric trams. An additional station Laira Halt was opened between Plympton and Mutley until its closure in 1930. Mutley then shut in 1939. From 1941 Plymouth Millbay was closed to passengers following an air raid and Plymouth railway station became the main central destination in the city and remained the next station on the line westwards.

The station closed to passengers on 2 March 1959 but goods traffic continued to be handled until 1 June 1964. The station was demolished after closure and there are now no remains of the station.

Proposed reopening
A Plymouth Joint plan that was opened for consultation in 2018 included a suggested 'Plymouth Metro' with a station at Plympton. However, as of May 2020, nothing had been enacted.

References

Bibliography
 Tait, Derek. Plymouth From Old Photographs. Amberley Publishing Limited, 2011.

Disused railway stations in Plymouth, Devon
Former Great Western Railway stations
Railway stations in Great Britain opened in 1848
Railway stations in Great Britain closed in 1959